Selo pri Bledu is a settlement in the Municipality of Bled in the Upper Carniola region of Slovenia.

Name
The name of the settlement was changed from Selo to Selo pri Bledu in 1953.

References

External links

Selo pri Bledu at Geopedia

Populated places in the Municipality of Bled